A  may take the form of:

Although "proverb" and "saying" are practically synonymous, the same cannot be said about "idiomatic phrase" and "four-character idiom".  Not all kan'yōku and yojijukugo are proverbial. For instance, the kan'yōku  and the yojijukugo  are not proverbs. To be considered a proverb, a word or phrase must express a common truth or wisdom; it cannot be a mere noun.

Origin 
Numerous Asian proverbs, including Japanese, appear to be derived from older Chinese proverbs, although it often is impossible to be completely sure about the direction of cultural influences (and hence, the origins of a particular proverb or idiomatic phrase).

Because traditional Japanese culture was tied to agriculture, many Japanese proverbs are derived from agricultural customs and practices. Some are from the Go game (e.g.), the tea ceremony (e.g.), and Buddhism. Many four-character idioms are from Chinese philosophy written in Classical Chinese, in particular "The Analects" by Confucius. ( is Classical Chinese, from the Zhuangzi.)

Usage 
Japanese commonly use proverbs, often citing just the first part of common phrases for brevity. For example, one might say  to refer to the proverb . Whereas proverbs in English are typically multi-worded phrases (e.g. "kill two birds with one stone"), Japanese yojijukugo borrow from Chinese and compactly convey the concept in one compound word (e.g.).

Examples

Sayings 
案ずるより産むが易しい。
 Anzuru yori umu ga yasashii.
Literally:  Giving birth to a baby is easier than worrying about it.
Meaning: Fear is greater than the danger. / An attempt is sometimes easier than expected.
出る杭は打たれる。
 Deru kui wa utareru.
 Literally: The stake that sticks up gets hammered down.
 Meaning: If you stand out, you will be subject to criticism.
知らぬが仏。
 Shiranu ga hotoke.
 Literally: Not knowing is Buddha.
 Meaning: Ignorance is bliss. / What you don't know can't hurt you.
見ぬが花。
 Minu ga hana.
 Literally: Not seeing is a flower.
 Meaning: Reality can't compete with imagination.
花は桜木人は武士
 Hana wa sakuragi, hito wa bushi.
 Literally: Of flowers, the cherry blossom; of men, the warrior.
 Meaning: As the cherry blossom is considered foremost among flowers, so the warrior is foremost among men.

Idiomatic phrases 
猫に小判
 Neko ni koban
 Literally: Gold coins to a cat.
 Meaning: Casting pearls before swine / Giving something of value to a recipient that does not value it.
七転び八起き
 Nanakorobi yaoki
 Literally: Fall seven times and stand up eight
 Meaning: When life knocks you down, stand back up; What matters is not the bad that happened, but what one does after.
猿も木から落ちる
 Saru mo ki kara ochiru
 Literally: Even monkeys fall from trees
 Meaning: Anyone can make a mistake.
花より団子
 Hana yori dango
 Literally: Dumplings rather than flowers
 Meaning: To prefer substance over form, as in to prefer to be given functional, useful items (such as dumplings) instead of merely decorative items (such as flowers).

Four-character idioms 

十人十色
 jūnin toiro
 Literally: ten persons, ten colors
 Meaning: To each his own. / Different strokes for different folks.
因果応報
 inga ōhō
 Literally: Cause bring result / bad causes bring bad results 
 Meaning: what goes around comes around 
 Note: this is a Buddhist sentiment that emphasizes the idea of karmic retribution.
弱肉強食
 jaku niku kyō shoku
 Literally: The weak are meat; the strong eat.
 Meaning: Survival of the fittest.

See also 
Chinese proverbs
Japanese culture
Japanese language
Korean proverbs

References

Further reading 
 De Lange, William. (2013). A Dictionary of Japanese Proverbs. TOYO Press.

External links 

故事ことわざ辞典 (in Japanese)
Japanese Proverbs
Japanese Language Kotowaza – proverbs & sayings
Words of Wisdom OK312 「英⇔日」対照・名言ことわざ辞典
 Nihon no Kotowaza
ことわざ辞典 (in Japanese)
Japanese Kotowaza (in Japanese and English) 
Japanese / English / Dutch v.v. Proverb dictionary
Golden Proverbs A nice collection of Japanese proverbs.

 
Proverbs by language

ja:日本のことわざ